The Iranian village of Bonari-ye Olya (also Romanized as Bonārī-ye ‘Olyā; also known as Banārī-ye Bālā, Benāri-ye Bālā, and Bonārī-ye Bālā) is located in Charam Rural District, in the Central District of Charam County, Kohgiluyeh and Boyer-Ahmad Province. At the 2006 census, its population was 322, in 56 families.

References 

Populated places in Charam County